Nanorana ventripunctata (common names: Yunnan slow frog, spot-bellied plateau frog) is a species of frog in the family Dicroglossidae. It is endemic to northwestern Yunnan, China. It inhabits lakes, pools and ponds in alpine areas, occurring near streams and rivers in open, high-elevation habitats. It breeds in still-water pools and ponds.

References

ventripunctata
Amphibians of China
Endemic fauna of Yunnan
Taxonomy articles created by Polbot
Amphibians described in 1985